Cappankelly is a townland in County Westmeath, Ireland. The townland is in the civil parish of St. Mary's.

The townland is located to the north of Athlone, with the Killinure Lough and Lough Ree to the north, and the smaller Balaghhkeeran Bay to the east, and Coosan Lough to the west.

References 

Townlands of County Westmeath